Anthony Michael Hargain (born December 26, 1967) is a former American football wide receiver who played one season with the Kansas City Chiefs of the National Football League (NFL). He was drafted by the San Francisco 49ers in the eighth round of the 1991 NFL Draft. He played college football at the University of Oregon and attended Center High School in Elverta, California. He was also a member of the Los Angeles Rams and Sacramento Gold Miners.

Tony is the owner and founder of Hustlin USA Clothing Company.

References

External links
Just Sports Stats
Fanbase profile

Living people
1967 births
American football wide receivers
Canadian football wide receivers
African-American players of American football
African-American players of Canadian football
Oregon Ducks football players
Kansas City Chiefs players
Los Angeles Rams players
Sacramento Gold Miners players
Players of American football from California
Sportspeople from Palo Alto, California
21st-century African-American people
20th-century African-American sportspeople